The 2013–14 NJIT Highlanders men's basketball team represented New Jersey Institute of Technology during the 2013–14 NCAA Division I men's basketball season. The Highlanders, led by sixth year head coach Jim Engles, played their home games at the Fleisher Center and were in their first year as an Independent. They finished the season 13–16.

Roster

Schedule

|-
!colspan=9 style="background:#FF0000; color:#000080;"| Regular Season

References

NJIT Highlanders men's basketball seasons
Njit